The Lafayette Leopards men's ice hockey team is a college ice hockey program that represents Lafayette College. The team currently operates an unofficial club team but the university previously sponsored varsity ice hockey between 1936 and 1941.

History
The first attempt at forming an ice hockey team at Lafayette came in the 1920s. While nothing materialized at the time, the students did eventually put together the first unofficial hockey club in 1935. Finding ice time was difficult without a local rink, however, there was enough interest from the student body that the school allowed a formal team to be formed two years later. Arranged and coached by then-Athletic Director Henry W. Clark, who was aided by Religious Studies professor Dale H. Moore, Lafayette played its first official game in February 1937. A few weeks later, the team won its first game by defeating nearby rival Lehigh.

After a second season, the school decided to discontinue its support for the team, which then continued in an unofficial capacity. A successful campaign from the student body restored the team's varsity status in 1939 and was followed by the club's entry into a small conference. While Lafayette now had a little more stability with its schedule, the biggest impediment for the club remained; it did not possess a home rink. The lack of attention from the student body caused the number of prospective player to sharply decline after the team's first winning season and the program was mothballed in 1942.

After World War II, the team was reformed, however, it only did so in an unofficial capacity. The club continued for a few years before disappearing altogether. In the succeeding years it has resurfaced but there have been no attempts to return it to varsity status.

Season-by-season results

Varsity

Source:

Notes

References

External links
Official site

Lafayette Leopards
Lafayette Leopards men's ice hockey
Ice hockey teams in Pennsylvania
1936 establishments in Pennsylvania
Ice hockey clubs established in 1936